José Antonio Franco Arévalos (born May 10, 1979 in Mariano Roque Alonso, Paraguay) is a Paraguayan footballer currently playing for Sport Colombia of the División Intermedia in Paraguay.

Teams
  Sol de América 1997-2003
  Santiago Wanderers 2004
  12 de Octubre 2004
  Rangers 2005
  Guaraní 2005
  Olimpia Asunción 2006
  Sol de América 2006-2007
  3 de Febrero 2008
  Atlético Bucaramanga 2008
  Alianza Atlético 2009
  Sol de América 2009
  General Caballero 2010-2011
  Sport Colombia 2012–present

External links
 Profile at BDFA
 

1979 births
Living people
People from Mariano Roque Alonso
Paraguayan footballers
Paraguayan expatriate footballers
Club Atlético 3 de Febrero players
Club Guaraní players
Club Olimpia footballers
12 de Octubre Football Club players
Sport Colombia footballers
Club Sol de América footballers
General Caballero Sport Club footballers
Santiago Wanderers footballers
Rangers de Talca footballers
Alianza Atlético footballers
Atlético Bucaramanga footballers
Paraguayan Primera División players
Peruvian Primera División players
Chilean Primera División players
Categoría Primera A players
Expatriate footballers in Chile
Expatriate footballers in Peru
Expatriate footballers in Colombia
Association footballers not categorized by position